Angelika Kraus (born 9 May 1950 in Celle) is a German former swimmer who competed in the 1968 Summer Olympics and in the 1972 Summer Olympics.

References

1950 births
Living people
German female swimmers
German female backstroke swimmers
Olympic swimmers of West Germany
Swimmers at the 1968 Summer Olympics
Swimmers at the 1972 Summer Olympics
Olympic bronze medalists for West Germany
Olympic bronze medalists in swimming
European Aquatics Championships medalists in swimming
Medalists at the 1968 Summer Olympics
People from Celle
Sportspeople from Lower Saxony